Culland's Grove was a merchant ship launched in 1802 that the British East India Company (EIC) hired as an "extra ship". On her maiden voyage she sailed to Bengal and Benkulen. The French privateer Blonde captured her on her return voyage.

Career
Culland's Grove enters the shipping registers in 1802, with the entry in the Register of Shipping being earlier than that in Lloyd's Register.

Captain Archibald Anderson sailed Culland's Grove from Portsmouth on 20 May 1802. He left during peacetime, but while he was away war with France resumed in early 1803. The EIC arranged for the issuance of a letter of marque that authorized him to engage in offensive action against the French should the opportunity arise. The letter was issued on 20 June 1803.

Aregnaudeau had had a successful cruise already, but Culland's Grove, as an Indiaman returning with a valuable cargo, proved to be a particularly attractive prize. Culland's Grove was not in a position to resist and struck. Aregnaudeau took her and another of his prizes, a former Royal Navy brig converted to a whaling ship that was returning to London from the South Seas Fisheries, into Pasajes on 3 August. Culland's Grove then sailed from Pasajes to Bordeaux where she was condemned as a prize. 

According to French records, Culland's Grove proved to be worth 2.5 million francs in insurance money. The EIC put the value of the cargo lost when the French captured her at £24,640.

Controversy
The Committee of Directors of the EIC prepared a report that they sent to Sir Evan Nepean, Secretary of the Navy, who transmitted it to Admiral sir William Cornwallis, commander-in-chief of the Channel Fleet.

Shortly before Culland's Grove was captured, she had encountered Endymion. The officer Paget sent aboard the Indiaman proceeded to press 12 seamen. Culland's Groves captain and second officer protested vehemently that they were already weakly manned and that this would leave them even more short-handed, but Paget was acting within the law. The Royal Navy was short of men and was in the habit of stopping homecoming merchant vessels and taking some of their best sailors. Paget's position was that the men he took were "surplus company, and that he was authorized to press men out of homeward-bound ships."

All that came of this was that Paget was reminded of his obligations "to protect and assist the trade of His Majesty's subjects." As the privateer Blonde had an armament and complement more than double that of Culland's Grove, even without the impressment, it is not clear that Paget's depredations mattered. One would have to argue that a better-manned Culland's Grove might have outsailed Blonde.

Notes, citations, and references
Notes

Citations

References
 
 
 
  

1802 ships
Ships built in Whitby
Ships of the British East India Company
Captured ships